Lars Tore Gustafsson (born 11 February 1962) is a retired male hammer thrower from Sweden, who competed at three consecutive Summer Olympics, starting in 1988 (Seoul, South Korea). Since his retirement from competition, he has enjoyed success as a hammer coach

Competitive career

A member of the Mölndals Almänna Idrottsklubb he set the national record at 80.14 metres on 4 July 1989, in Lappeenranta, Finland. Gustafsson lives in Los Gatos, California, and works as a chiropractor.

Coaching

Gustafsson has been involved in coaching since he retired. Koji Murofushi won the gold medal at 2011 World Championships in Daegu Korea and bronze medal at the 2012 London Olympics with Gustafsson as his Coach. In 2016, another of his athletes, Great Britain's Sophie Hitchon, won bronze in the hammer at the 2016 Olympic Games, her country's first ever global medal in that discipline.2018 coached (Nick Miller GB) to win Gold and National record 80.26 at the (Commonwealth games in Australia)). (Nick Miller) finished 6th at the (2020 Summer Olympics)

Achievements

References

sports-reference
Profile

External links
 

1962 births
Living people
Swedish male hammer throwers
Athletes (track and field) at the 1988 Summer Olympics
Athletes (track and field) at the 1992 Summer Olympics
Athletes (track and field) at the 1996 Summer Olympics
Olympic athletes of Sweden
Athletes from Gothenburg
Swedish chiropractors
American chiropractors
Competitors at the 1986 Goodwill Games